Mikhail Sannikov (born 30 November 1961) is a Russian cleric, abbot of Shadchupling in Sverdlovsk oblast, Russian Federation.

Sources 

 Пореш В. Тибетский буддизм в России // "Современная религиозная жизнь России", Т.3 / Отв. ред. М. Бурдо, С.Б. Филатов. - М., "Логос", 2005,

Russian media sources

 Архипов А. Монах // «Argumenty i Fakty – Урал», No.39, 2003
 Бессарабова А. Наш корреспондент попробовал стать буддийским монахом // «Мир новостей», 20.12.2005
 Жуковская А. Судьба разведчика по-уральски. Резидент стал буддийским монахом // «Argumenty i Fakty – Урал», No.34, 2006
 Самоделова С. Земля Санникова // «Moskovsky Komsomolets», 12.01.2006
 Хазов А., Суворова Т. Уральский буддизм. //«Uralsky Sledopyt», No.7, 2002
 Шорин А. Буддийский монастырь под угрозой сноса // «Областная газета», 14.09.2006.

1961 births
Living people
People from Votkinsk
Soviet military personnel of the Soviet–Afghan War
Tibetan Buddhists from Russia
Converts to Buddhism